Chaudhary Charan Singh Post Graduate College is a government aided private college at Heonra, a village adjacent to Saifai in Etawah. It was established as Chaudhary Charan Singh Degree College by Mulayam Singh Yadav in 1983. It is affiliated to Chhatrapati Shahu Ji Maharaj University (formerly Kanpur University) and offers under-graduate and post-graduate courses in science, arts, commerce, agriculture, computer application, management, education, library & information science and physical education.

Law College
Chaudhary Charan Singh College of Law is a law college in CCS PG College campus, established in 2012. It offers under-graduate course in law i.e. 3 year LL.B. It is affiliated to Chhatrapati Shahu Ji Maharaj University and The Bar Council of India for 120 students every year in 3 year LL.B. from 2012.

Management
The college is run by the Shiksha Prasar Samiti society, presided by Shivpal Singh Yadav.

Notable alumni
Arvind Pratap, former MLC

References

External links
 

Colleges affiliated to Chhatrapati Shahu Ji Maharaj University
Universities and colleges in Saifai
Science colleges in India
Arts colleges in India
Colleges of education in India
Commerce colleges in India
Agricultural universities and colleges in Uttar Pradesh
Postgraduate colleges in Uttar Pradesh
Kanpur division
Educational institutions established in 1983
1983 establishments in Uttar Pradesh
Memorials to Chaudhary Charan Singh